is a Rinzai temple in Kurume, Fukuoka Prefecture, Japan. It is known as a representative training dojo temple of the Myōshin-ji school in Kyushu which faces the clear stream of the Chikugo River.

History

The temple was originally located in Fukuchiyama and called Zuigan-ji (瑞巌寺). In 1620, however, Arima Toyōji who was transferred from Fukuchiyama Domain in the Tanba Province to Kurume Domain, started to move to the present location in the following year. Later it was renamed to Bairin-ji which is associated with his father Noriyori's posthumous name, Bairin'in-den (梅林院殿) and became a mausoleum of the successive Kurume Domain. There remains a grave of the Arima clan, including Toyōji.

Important Cultural Properties
The colored silk wooden Avalokiteśvara statue in the main hall is the work of the Kamakura period.

The Garden

The Gaien (外苑) is a garden which is adjacent to Chikugo River side to the north side. Approximately 30 species of 500 plums donated by the citizens, and many azaleas are planted in the garden. It was opened as a park in 1958 to commemorate the 350 years old of the founding priest, Umon Genkyū Zenji (禹門玄級禅師).

References

External links
Bairin-ji Temple - Kurume Convention Bureau

Buddhist temples in Fukuoka Prefecture
Rinzai school
Buildings and structures in Fukuoka Prefecture
Kurume